Saint-Martin-le-Gaillard is a commune in the Seine-Maritime department in the Normandy region in northern France.

Geography

Heraldry

Population

Places of interest
 The church of Notre-Dame at St. Martin, dating from the thirteenth century.
 The church of St. Sulpice, dating from the sixteenth century.
 The church of St. Ouen at Auberville, dating from the seventeenth century, now a house.
 Ruins of a feudal castle.

See also
Communes of the Seine-Maritime department

References

Communes of Seine-Maritime